Hypochalcia decorella is a species of snout moth in the genus Hypochalcia. It was described by Jacob Hübner in 1810. It is found from France to Russia and from Germany and Poland to Italy, Croatia, Hungary and Romania. It has also been recorded from Kazakhstan.

References

Moths described in 1810
Phycitini
Moths of Europe